Marc Burrows (15 October 1978 – 9 February 2009) was an English footballer, who played as a forward. He grew up in Sandown on the Isle of Wight and attended Sandham Middle School before heading to Sandown High School.

Playing career
After beginning his career on a two-year apprenticeship at Portsmouth, Burrows played for non-league clubs Cowes Sports, Christchurch, Brading Town, Eastleigh and West Moors. His playing career included appearances in the FA Cup, FA Vase and was part of the Eastleigh Social Club squad that played in the Carlsberg Pub Cup Final, held on 6 May 2000 at the old Wembley Stadium.

Burrows is recognised as scoring the sport's fastest ever goal, beating both the former English record of Colin Cowperthwaite (3.5 seconds) and the world record held by Ricardo Oliveira (2.8 seconds). The record was set in a reserve team match against Eastleigh in 2004, when Burrows spotted the goalkeeper off his line and shot straight from kick-off. With the wind behind it the ball landed in the goal, and was recorded by the match referee at 2.5 seconds. The Football Association later confirmed this goal was a world record for the sport.

Death

Burrows died on 9 February 2009, aged 30, after being diagnosed with cancer.

See also
Fastest goals in association football

References

1978 births
2009 deaths
People from Sandown
English footballers
Association football forwards
Cowes Sports F.C. players
Christchurch F.C. players
Brading Town F.C. players
Eastleigh F.C. players
Deaths from cancer in England